John Henry Rohde (February 10, 1927 – July 12, 2001) was an American football player and coach.  He served as the head football coach at the University of the Pacific in Stockton, California from 1961 to 1963, compiling a record of 12–7.  Rohde attended Abraham Lincoln High School in San Jose, California and played college football as an end at Pacific from 1946 to 1949.  He was selected to play in the East–West Shrine Game in 1949.  Rohde was selected by the Washington Redskins of the National Football League (NFL) in the eighth round of the 1950 NFL Draft.  Following a brief stint with the Redskins, Rohde worked as graduate assistant as his alma mater.  He was engaged in business in Arizona in 1951 and 1952 before returning to Pacific again in 1953 as an assistant coach.  He was appointed as assistant athletic director at Pacific in 1957.  Rohde died of a heart attack at the age of 74, on July 12, 2001, in Sacramento, California.

Head coaching record

College

References

1927 births
2001 deaths
American football ends
Pacific Tigers football coaches
Pacific Tigers football players
Players of American football from San Jose, California